King's Chapel is an American independent Christian unitarian congregation affiliated with the Unitarian Universalist Association that is "unitarian Christian in theology, Anglican in worship, and congregational in governance." It is housed in what was for a time after the Revolution called the "Stone Chapel", an 18th-century structure at the corner of Tremont Street and School Street in Boston, Massachusetts. The chapel building, completed in 1754, is one of the finest designs of the noted colonial architect Peter Harrison, and was designated a National Historic Landmark in 1960 for its architectural significance. The congregation has worshipped according to a Unitarian version of the Book of Common Prayer since 1785, currently in its ninth edition.

Despite its name, the adjacent King's Chapel Burying Ground is not affiliated with the chapel or any other church; it pre-dates the present church by over a century.

History

The King's Chapel congregation was founded by Royal Governor Sir Edmund Andros in 1686 as the first Anglican Church in colonial New England during the reign of King James II. The original King's Chapel was a wooden church built in 1688 at the corner of Tremont and School Streets, where the church stands today. It was situated on the public burying ground, now King's Chapel Burying Ground, because no resident would sell land for a church that was not Congregationalist (at the time, the Congregational church was the official religion of Massachusetts).

In 1749, construction began on the current stone structure, which was designed by Peter Harrison and completed in 1754. The stone church was built around the wooden church. When the stone church was complete, the wooden church was disassembled and removed through the windows of the new church. The wood was then shipped to Lunenburg, Nova Scotia, where it was used to construct St. John's Anglican Church. That church was destroyed by fire on Halloween night, 2001. It has since been rebuilt. Originally, there were plans to add a steeple, although funding shortfalls prevented this from happening.

During the American Revolution, the chapel sat vacant and was referred to as the "Stone Chapel". The Loyalist families left for Nova Scotia and England, and those who remained reopened the church in 1782. It became Unitarian under the ministry of James Freeman, who revised the 1662 English edition of the Book of Common Prayer along Unitarian lines in 1785. Although Freeman still considered King's Chapel to be Episcopalian, the Episcopal Church's first bishop Samuel Seabury refused to ordain him. The church still follows its own Anglican-style hybrid liturgy. It is a member congregation of the Unitarian Universalist Association.

Inside, the church is characterized by wooden columns with Corinthian capitals that were hand-carved by William Burbeck and his apprentices in 1758. Seating is accommodated by box pews, most of which were originally owned by the member families who paid pew rent and decorated the pews to their personal tastes. The coveted Pew No. 30 is the Governor's Pew (reserved for Jonathan Belcher, the Royal Governor) was, on October 27, 1789, occupied by George Washington. Belcher's son, Jonathan Jr., was wed in the chapel in 1756. The current uniform appearance of the pews dates from the 1920s.

Music has long been an important part of King's Chapel, which acquired its first organ in 1713, bequeathed to the congregation by Puritan minister Thomas Brattle. Other organs that followed were built by Richard Bridge, Hook & Hastings, and Simmons & Willcox. The fifth organ installed in the chapel was a large 1909 E.M. Skinner organ. It had been a gift from Frank E. Peabody in memory of his deceased son Everett. The present organ, the sixth installed in King's Chapel, was built by C.B. Fisk in 1964. It is decorated with miters and carvings from the Bridge organ of 1756, and it is slightly below average in size compared with most mid-1900s European chapel organs. For forty-two years starting in 1958, the eminent American composer Daniel Pinkham was the organist and music director at King's Chapel. He was succeeded by Heinrich Christensen.

The King's Chapel bell, cast in England, was hung in 1772. In 1814 it cracked, was recast by Paul Revere and Sons, and was rehung. It is the largest bell cast by the Revere foundry, and the last one cast during Paul Revere's lifetime. It has been rung at services ever since.

Within King's Chapel is a monument to Samuel Vassall, brother of the colonist William Vassall, a patentee of the Massachusetts Bay Company, and an early deputy of the Massachusetts Bay Colony. Samuel Vassall of London was also named a member of the Company in its 1629 Royal Charter but never sailed for New England, instead remaining in London to tend to business affairs; his brother William frequently clashed with John Winthrop, and eventually removed himself to Scituate, Massachusetts. The monument to Vassall, London merchant, mentions his resistance to King Charles's taxes imposed on Tonnage and Poundage, especially as Parliament had refused the King's request for a lifetime extension. Vassall subsequently represented the City of London as a Member of Parliament (1640–1641), which restored some of Vassall's estate. Later Vassalls in Massachusetts, including William Vassall for whom Vassalboro, Maine was named, were Loyalists and fled to England during the American Revolutionary War.

Ministers
 Robert Ratcliff, rector 1686–1689
 Samuel Myles, rector 1689–1728 (d. 1728)
 Roger Price, rector 1729–1746
 Henry Caner, rector 1747–1776
 James Freeman, rector 1787–1836 (d.1836)
 Samuel Cary, minister 1809–1815 (d.1815)
 F.W.P. Greenwood, minister 1824–1843 (d. 1843)
 Ephraim Peabody, minister 1845–1856 (d. 1856)
 no regular minister 1856–1861
 Henry Wilder Foote, minister 1861–1889 (d. 1889)
 no regular minister 1889–1895
 Howard Nicholson Brown, minister 1895–1921
 Harold Edwin Balme Speight, minister 1921–1927
 John Carroll Perkins, minister in charge 1927–1931, minister 1931–1933 (guardian of Emily Hale)
 Palfrey Perkins, minister 1933–1953
 Joseph Barth, minister 1953–1965 (d. 1988)
 no regular minister 1965–1967
 Carl R. Scovel, senior minister 1967–1999
 Charles C. Forman, affiliate minister 1980–1998 (d. 1998)
 Matthew M. McNaught, interim minister 1999–2001
 Earl K. Holt, minister 2001–2009
 Dianne E. Arakawa, interim minister 2009–2013
 Joy Fallon, minister 2013–present

Gallery

See also 
 List of National Historic Landmarks in Boston
 National Register of Historic Places listings in northern Boston, Massachusetts

References 
Notes

Further reading
 A History of King's Chapel, in Boston: The First Episcopal Church in New England By Francis William Pitt Greenwood (1833) at Google Books
 Annals of King's Chapel from the Puritan age of New England to the present day. Boston: Little, Brown, 1882, 1896. vol.1; vol.2.
 
 The Organs and Music of King's Chapel, 1713–1991 by Barbara Owen (1993: King's Chapel, Boston MA)

External links 

 
 The Boston Athenaeum "houses the King’s Chapel Collection of mostly 17th century theological works"
 Boston National Historical Park Official Website
 

1686 establishments in Massachusetts
18th-century churches in the United States
Bell towers in the United States
Chapels in the United States
Churches completed in 1754
Churches in Boston
Former Episcopal church buildings in the United States
Libraries in British North America
National Historic Landmarks in Boston
National Register of Historic Places in Boston
Properties of religious function on the National Register of Historic Places in Massachusetts
Religious organizations established in the 1680s
Stone churches in Massachusetts
Towers in Massachusetts
Unitarian Universalist churches in Massachusetts